Prodigal Daughters is a 1923 American silent societal drama film produced by Famous Players-Lasky and distributed through Paramount Pictures. The film stars Gloria Swanson and was directed by Sam Wood. It is based on a novel of the same name by Joseph Hocking.

Plot
As described in a film magazine review, Swifty Forbes becomes a flapper when her father J.D. Forbes becomes rich during the War. She lives a life of unrestrained pleasure and is loved by Roger Corbin, an aviator, and Stanley Garside, a gambler. Her sister Marjory follows the same trail and, when their father protests, they leave home to lead their own lives in Greenwich Village. Forbes, the father, in despair leaves the business in the hands of the young Corbin. Swifty loses all her money in Garside's card room and plays the cards for the cancelation of her debt against her marriage to Garside. She loses and must marry Garside within sixty days. While in the cabin of a new locomotive produced at her father's works, the thing starts and kills Garside, who was in an automobile. She ends up rescued by Corbin, who goes after her in an airplane and the two marry.

Cast

Production
Some portions of this film were shot in Swanson's own palatial Hollywood mansion. A young and then unknown Mervyn LeRoy appears unbilled as a newsboy. He later directed Swanson in her early talkie Tonight or Never.

Preservation
With no prints of Prodigal Daughters located in any film archives, it is a lost film.

References

External links

Lobby card and still at silenthollywood.com

1923 films
1923 drama films
Silent American drama films
American silent feature films
American black-and-white films
Famous Players-Lasky films
Films based on British novels
Films directed by Sam Wood
Paramount Pictures films
Lost American films
1923 lost films
Lost drama films
1920s American films